The 1988–89 Associate Members' Cup (known as the 1988–89 Sherpa Van Trophy) was the sixth staging of the Associate Members' Cup, a knock-out competition for English football clubs in the Third Division and the Fourth Division. The winners were Bolton Wanderers and the runners-up were Torquay United.

The competition began on 21 November 1988 and ended with the final on 28 May 1989 at Wembley Stadium.

In the first round, there were two sections split into eight groups: North and South. In the following rounds each section gradually eliminates teams in knock-out fashion until each has a winning finalist. At this point, the two winning finalists faced each other in the combined final for the honour of the trophy.

Preliminary round

Northern Section

Southern Section

First round

Northern Section

Southern Section

Quarter-finals

Northern Section

Southern Section

Area semi-finals

Northern Section

Southern Section

Area finals

Northern Area final

Southern Area final

Final

Notes
General
statto.com

Specific

EFL Trophy
Tro